The velopharyngeal port or velopharyngeal sphincter is the passage between the nasopharynx and the oropharynx. It is closed off by the soft palate and uvula against the rear pharyngeal wall during swallowing to prevent food and water from entering the nasal passages. During speech, it is open for nasal sounds and closed for oral sounds. It is affected by cleft palate, resulting in velopharyngeal consonants. 

Pharynx
Human throat
Human voice